Alto  Sermenza is a comune (municipality) in the Province of Vercelli in the Italian region Piedmont, established on 1 January 2018 by the merger of the Rima San Giuseppe and Rimasco, in Valsesia.

References

Cities and towns in Piedmont